Chahak (also Romanized as Chāhak; also known as Chāhak-e Bālā) is a village in Mardehek Rural District, Jebalbarez-e Jonubi District, Anbarabad County, Kerman Province, Iran. At the 2006 census, its population was 60, in 17 families.

References 

Populated places in Anbarabad County